"Let It Snow! Let It Snow! Let It Snow!", also known as simply "Let It Snow", is a song written by lyricist Sammy Cahn and composer Jule Styne in July 1945 in Hollywood, California, during a heat wave as Cahn and Styne imagined cooler conditions. The song was first recorded that fall by Vaughn Monroe, was released just after Thanksgiving, and became a hit by Christmas.

Despite the lyrics making no mention of any holiday, the song has come to be regarded as a Christmas song worldwide due to its winter theme, being played on radio stations during the Christmas and holiday season, and having often been covered by various artists on Christmas-themed albums. In the Southern Hemisphere, it can be played during the winter months of June, July, and August; and in New Zealand, some play it at Matariki.

Frank Sinatra version

American singer Frank Sinatra released a version as a single in 1950 that featured The B. Swanson Quartet.

Certifications

Dean Martin version

American singer Dean Martin released a version of the song in 1959, as part of his album A Winter Romance, and a re-recorded version in 1966, as part of The Dean Martin Christmas Album. The song entered the Billboard Hot 100 for the first time in 2018.

Certifications

Jessica Simpson version

American singer Jessica Simpson released a version of the song in 2004, as part of her album Rejoyce: The Christmas Album. Her version was produced by Billy Mann. The song has a music video. Simpson's version reached No. 20 on the Billboard Adult Contemporary chart.

Other charting recordings

Glee Cast version

Michael Bublé version

Other notable versions
Widely heard recordings of the song include:
 1945 (first recording) – Vaughn Monroe for RCA Victor, which became a popular hit, reaching No. 1 on the Billboard "Best Sellers" music chart for five weeks from late December into early 1946. Vaughn later re-recorded the song in stereo for his 1958 album There I Sing/Swing It Again.
 1946 – Woody Herman for Columbia Records, which reached No. 8 on the Billboard chart. Other 1946 versions were recorded by Connee Boswell for Decca Records and Bob Crosby for ARA Records.
 1962 – Bing Crosby, on his album I Wish You a Merry Christmas.
 2003 - Cliff Richard, on his album Cliff at Christmas.
 2005 – Carly Simon, on a CD single. Her version is unusual in being sung from the point of view of the host instead of the guest. It peaked at No. 6 on the Billboard Adult Contemporary chart.
 2012 – Rod Stewart, on his album Merry Christmas, Baby. Stewart's version reached No. 1 on Billboards Adult Contemporary chart in December 2012 and remained there for a total of five weeks, tying it for the longest leading rendition of a holiday title in the history of the chart.
 2017 - Gwen Stefani, on her album You Make It Feel Like Christmas.
 2019 - Robbie Williams, on his album The Christmas Present.

See also
 List of Billboard Adult Contemporary number ones of 2012
 List of Billboard Adult Contemporary number ones of 2021

References

1945 songs
1946 singles
1993 singles
2004 singles
American Christmas songs
Pop standards
Songs about weather
Songs with lyrics by Sammy Cahn
Songs with music by Jule Styne
Chicago (band) songs
Vaughn Monroe songs
Dean Martin songs
Rod Stewart songs
Winter in culture
Bing Crosby songs
Frank Sinatra songs
Carly Simon songs
Margaret (singer) songs
Columbia Records singles
Capitol Records singles